Tethya bergquistae is a species of sea sponge belonging to the family Tethyidae.

In Australia, it is found in off the Victorian, South Australian and Tasmanian coasts, and in New Zealand off the shores of both North and South Islands.

It was first described by John Hooper in 1994.

References 

Hadromerida
Animals described in 1994
Taxa named by John Hooper (marine biologist)